The Shire of Sarina was a local government area located in the Central Queensland region of Queensland, Australia.

The shire was situated to the south of Mackay on the Coral Sea coast. The area's industry is based on agriculture, tourism and the export of coal.

History
Pioneer Division was one of the 74 divisional boards established on 11 November 1879 under the Divisional Boards Act 1879 with a population of 2884 and covered the region surrounding but not including the Borough of Mackay. With the passage of the Local Authorities Act 1902, Pioneer Division became the Shire of Pioneer on 31 March 1903.

The Shire of Sarina was established from part of the Shire of Pioneer (Mackay) on 1 January 1912 under the Local Authorities Act 1902. Its first chairman was Alex Innes.

On 15 March 2008, under the Local Government (Reform Implementation) Act 2007 passed by the Parliament of Queensland on 10 August 2007, the Shire of Sarina merged with the City of Mackay and Shire of Mirani to form the Mackay Region.

Towns and localities
The Shire of Sarina included the following settlements:

Towns:
 Sarina
 Alligator Creek
 Armstrong Beach
 Campwin Beach
 Freshwater Point
 Grasstree Beach
 Half Tide Beach
 Hay Point
 Koumala
 Sarina Beach

Localities:
 Louisa Creek
 Munbura
 West Plane Creek

Chairmen 
 1927: John Christopher Nicholson 
 1964—1974: Tom Newbery

Population

References

Former local government areas of Queensland
2008 disestablishments in Australia
Populated places disestablished in 2008